Soundtrack 90210 is the first soundtrack album from the television series 90210 since it relaunched in 2008. The album features 14 tracks that appeared in season two of 90210.

During production of the second season of 90210, executive producer Rebecca Sinclair and music supervisor Scott Vener listened to dozens of submitted tracks before choosing those they felt best suited to upcoming story-lines. The album features those songs that were selected.

The track listing on the compact disc version of the album mislabeled "I Want You So Bad I Can't Breathe" by OK Go as "I Want You So Bad" and "Understand" by Darrelle London as "Understood".

Track list

References

External links

 Official website

Beverly Hills, 90210 (franchise)
Television soundtracks
2009 soundtrack albums